Forquilhinha is a municipality in the Brazilian state of Santa Catarina. In 2020, it had a population of 27,211 inhabitants. It covers an area of 184.557 km² at an altitude of 42 meters above sea level. It is the native town of cardinal Paulo Evaristo Arns and his sister Zilda Arns.

The city is served by Diomício Freitas Airport.

References

This article is a translation of the corresponding article in the Portuguese-language Wikipedia.

Municipalities in Santa Catarina (state)